The Augmentation of Benefices Act 1665 (17 Car 2 c 3) was an Act of the Parliament of England.

The Augmentation of Benefices Act 1665 was repealed by section 15 of the Pluralities Act 1838 (1 & 2 Vict c 106).

So much of the Augmentation of Benefices Act 1665 as enabled any owner or proprietor of any impropriation, tithes or portion of tithes, to annex the same or any part thereof unto the parsonage, vicarage or curacy of the parish church or chapel where the same lay or arose, or to settle the same in trust for the benefit of such parsonage, vicarage or curacy, and authorized parsons, vicars or incumbents to receive lands, tithes or other hereditaments without licence of mortmain, was revived by section 25 of the New Parishes Act 1843 (6 & 7 Vict c 37), which further provided that all augmentations and grants at any time theretofore made according to the Augmentation of Benefices Act 1665 were as good and effectual as if the same had never been repealed.

The whole Act, so far as unrepealed, was repealed by section 48(2) of, and Part II of Schedule 7 to, the Charities Act 1960.

References
Halsbury's Statutes,

Acts of the Parliament of England
1665 in law
1665 in England